Thiel is a German-language surname. Notable people with the name include:

 Adolf Thiel (1915–2001), German-American engineer
 Alvar Thiel (1893–1973), sailor
 Andreas Thiel (born 1960), German handball player
 Andreas Thiel (bishop) (1826–1908), Catholic bishop of Ermland
 Ben Thiel (born 1982), Australian Model, Golfer & Race Car Driver
 Bert Thiel (born 1926), baseball pitcher
 Claudia van Thiel (born 1977), female volleyball player
 Edward C. Thiel (1928–1961), geologist
 Edwin Thiel (1913–1944), German Luftwaffe ace
 Ernest Thiel (1859–1947), Swedish financier, art collector, and translator
 Frans-Jozef van Thiel (1906–1993), Dutch politician
 Heiner Thiel (born 1957), German sculptor and curator
 Heinz Thiel (1920–2003), German film director and screenwriter
 Jana Thiel (1971–2016), German sports presenter and journalist
 Joachim Thiel (born 1951), German footballer
 Jon Thiel (born 1975), rugby player
 Lisa Thiel, a professional quizzer and regular panelist on UK quiz show Eggheads
 Lucien Thiel (1943–2011), Luxembourgian politician
 Marie-Jo Thiel (born 1957), French ethicist
 Maximilian Thiel (born 1993), German professional footballer
 Midori Kono Thiel (born 1933), Japanese American calligrapher
 Otto Thiel (1891–1915), German football player
 Peter Thiel (born 1967), American entrepreneur
 Phil Thiel (born 1984), American rugby union player
 Pieter J.J. van Thiel (1928–2012), Dutch art historian
 Sten Thiel, Commissioner of the Svenska Scoutförbundet
 Tamiko Thiel (born 1957), American media artist
 Walter Thiel (1910–1943), German engineer
 Walter Thiel (chemist) (born 1949), German theoretical chemist
 Yannic Thiel (born 1989), German footballer

Fictional characters
 Frank Thiel, detective chief inspector in German television series Tatort Münster

See also
 Theil, common alternate & etymologically related variant of the surname

German-language surnames
Surnames from given names